Sylve Boris Bengtsson (2 July 1930 – 30 April 2005) was a Swedish association football forward.

Career
Bengtsson started his career in Halmstads BK at the age of 17 in 1947 against Djurgårdens IF, a 0–5 defeat. In 1948 as Halmstads BK was relegated from Allsvenskan Sylve left for Hälsingborgs IF (now Helsingborgs IF); during his time in Hälsingborg he made his first national team appearance for Sweden; he was later part of the Swedish national team that won bronze medal in the 1952 Summer Olympics in Helsinki after defeating West Germany.

After the Summer Olympics he returned to Halmstads BK and helped the club back up in Allsvenskan, in season 1954–55 he won the Stora Silvret with the club and in the following season he became the top goalscorer with 22 goals.  Halmstads BK was relegated yet again in 1959 and in 1961 Sylve left for Gnosjö IF where he played for three seasons before returning to Allsvenskan and Hälsingborgs IF to play between 1964 and 1965.

In 1967, he returned to Halmstads BK as a playing coach and in 1968 he became manager for Laholms FK, shortly south of Halmstad, he then returned to Halmstads BK as teamleader; he made a short time as manager yet again for the club during the summer of 1971 and led the club back to Allsvenskan.

Aside from playing football he also worked as a baker and confectioner.

Achievements

Club
Halmstads BK
 Allsvenskan: runners-up 1954–55

International
Sweden
 Summer Olympics third place: 1952

Individual
 Allsvenskan top goalscorer: 1955–1956

References

External links

 Halmstads BK article

1930 births
2005 deaths
Association football forwards
Halmstads BK players
Helsingborgs IF players
Allsvenskan players
Swedish footballers
Sweden international footballers
Olympic footballers of Sweden
Footballers at the 1952 Summer Olympics
Olympic bronze medalists for Sweden
Bakers
Swedish football managers
Halmstads BK managers
Olympic medalists in football
Medalists at the 1952 Summer Olympics
Sportspeople from Halmstad
Sportspeople from Halland County